Pomona is an unincorporated community in Pomona Township, Jackson County, Illinois, United States. Pomona has no post office as of 2010 ZIP code 62975.

The community was featured in the 2002 Steve James documentary Stevie.

References

Unincorporated communities in Jackson County, Illinois
Unincorporated communities in Illinois